Nella stanza 26 is the ninth studio album by Italian singer-songwriter Nek, released on 17 November 2006.

Overview
The title song "Nella stanza 26" (in English: "In the room 26") was inspired and dedicated to a girl who wrote the anonymous letter in which is told she has to prostitute to maintain her family. The other songs often tell stories of love gone wrong. In 2007, for the title song Nek received the prestigious Lunezia "Poesia del Rock" award.

It includes the hit single "Instabile", which peaked at number three, and ranked in the Top 5 for 6 weeks.

Track listing

Musicians 
 Nek – vocals, soloist guitar, acoustic guitar, electric guitar, backing vocals
 Cesare Chiodo – bass
 Max Costa – keyboards
 Alex Bagnoli – programming
 Luciano Galloni – drums
 Dado Parisini – keyboards, Hammond organ
 Vittorio Giannelli – programming
 Gabriele Cicognani – bass
 Paolo Costa – bass
 Emiliano Fantuzzi – bass, programming, electric guitar, slide guitar, keyboards
 Pier Foschi – drums
 Alfredo Golino – drums
 Roberto Gualdi – drums
 Massimo Pacciani – drums
 Massimo Varini – programming, backing vocals, electric guitar

Charts and certifications

Weekly charts

Year-end charts

Certifications

References

2006 albums
Nek albums